is a Japanese multinational corporation that produces sportswear. The name is an acronym for the Latin phrase anima sana in corpore sano (translated by Asics as "a sound mind, in a sound body"). Products manufactured and marketed by Asics include footwear (sneakers, sandals), clothing (T-shirts, jackets, hoodies, swimwear, compression garments, pants, socks), and accessories (bags, backpacks, caps).

History

Asics began as Onitsuka Co., Ltd on September 1, 1949. Founder  began manufacturing basketball shoes in his home town of Kobe, Hyogo Prefecture, Japan. The range of sports activities serviced by the company expanded to a variety of Olympic styles used since the 1950s by athletes worldwide. Onitsuka became particularly known for the Mexico 66 design, in which the distinctive crossed stripes (now synonymous with the company) were featured for the first time; martial artist Bruce Lee helped popularize the shoe. Onitsuka Tiger merged with fishing and sporting goods company GTO and athletic uniform maker Jelenk to form Asics Corporation in 1977; Onitsuka was named president of the new company. Despite the name change a vintage range of Asics shoes are still produced and sold internationally under the Onitsuka Tiger label.

In February 2016 Asics acquired fitness app Runkeeper.

Relationship with Nike
Nike, Inc. (originally known as Blue Ribbon Sports) was founded to sell Onitsuka Tiger shoes in the US. When Phil Knight visited Japan in 1963 shortly after he graduated from Stanford University he was impressed by Onitsuka Tiger shoes and immediately visited the Onitsuka Tiger office and asked to be their sales agent in the US. After a number of years the relationship crumbled and both companies sued each other, with Nike retaining the naming rights to several shoes.

Sponsorships

Asics sponsors a variety of sports associations, teams and individuals; sponsorships include World Athletics and the Los Angeles Marathon. The company announced on October 4, 2011 that it would be the new official kit manufacturer for the Australian Cricket Team, replacing German manufacturer Adidas.

Working conditions
In March 2017, employees assembling Asics products in Cambodia fainted due to thick smoke present in the factory where they were working. The company responded to this by saying that it, along with the factory in question, would "address specific measures, with a focus on workers’ awareness and health and safety training, as well as including an improved air ventilation system".

In March 2021, while several Western clothing brands expressed concern over allegations of forced Uyghur labor involved in Xinjiang cotton production, Asics announced that it would continue to source cotton from the region.

Gallery

Notes

References

External links

 

 
Athletic shoe brands
Japanese brands
Clothing companies established in 1949
Multinational companies headquartered in Japan
Manufacturing companies based in Kobe
Shoe brands
Shoe companies of Japan
Sporting goods brands
Sporting goods manufacturers of Japan
Sportswear brands
Swimwear manufacturers
1949 establishments in Japan
Companies based in Irvine, California
Companies listed on the Tokyo Stock Exchange
Clothing brands of Japan